The Bermuda national under-17 football team represents Bermuda in international football, and is controlled by the Bermuda Football Association, which is a member of the CONCACAF. The team compete in the CONCACAF U-17 Championship.

History

Players

Current squad
The following 20 players have been named in the final roster for the 2023 Concacaf Men’s Under-17 Championship held in Guatemala from February 11-26, 2023.

Head coach: Cecoy Robinson

Recent results & fixtures
The following is a list of match results from the previous 12 months, as well as any future matches that have been scheduled.

2019

Competitive records

FIFA U-17 World Cup

CONCACAF U-17 Championship

References

External links

Football in Bermuda
CONCACAF member associations
Football
Sports organizations established in 1928